Ghazan Abad is a Town and  a union council in Punjab, Pakistan.

On 1 July 2004, Ghazan Abad became the Union Council of Tehsil Kallar Syeda. Rawalpindi District was a Union Council of the Tehsil Kahuta.

External links
 
 Tehsil Kallar Syedian
 

Union councils of Kallar Syedan Tehsil
Populated places in Kallar Syedan Tehsil
Towns in Kallar Syedan Tehsil